This is a season-by-season list of records compiled by Niagara in men's ice hockey.

Niagara University has made four appearances in the NCAA Tournament, despite being one of the newest programs at the Division I level.

Season-by-season results

Note: GP = Games played, W = Wins, L = Losses, T = Ties

* Winning percentage is used when conference schedules are unbalanced.

Footnotes

References

 
Niagara
Niagara Purple Eagles ice hockey seasons